Live at Donte's may refer to:

 Live at Donte's (Jean-Luc Ponty album)
 Live at Donte's (Joe Pass album)
 Live at Donte's (Lenny Breau album)